Down Through the Years is a live album by saxophonist Clifford Jordan's Big Band that was recorded in New York City in 1991 and released on the Milestone label in 1992.

Reception

The AllMusic review by Ken Dryden observed: "This 1991 big-band performance at Condon's in New York City also represents the final recording as a leader by Clifford Jordan, who died in 1993. In addition to Jordan's powerful and soulful tenor sax, trumpeters Dizzy Reece and Don Sickler, alto saxophonist Jerome Richardson, and pianist Ronnie Mathews are among the all-stars present on the date".

Track listing

Personnel
Clifford Jordan – tenor saxophone, bandleader
Stephen Furtado, Dean Pratt, Dizzy Reece, Don Sickler – trumpet 
Brad Shigeta – trombone
Kiane Zawadi – euphonium
Jerome Richardson, Sue Terry - alto saxophone
Lou Orenstein, Willie Williams – tenor saxophone
Charles Davis – baritone saxophone
Ronnie Mathews – piano
David Williams – bass
Vernel Fournier – drums

References

Clifford Jordan live albums
1992 live albums
Milestone Records live albums